United Nations Security Council resolution 726, adopted unanimously on 6 January 1992, after reaffirming 607 (1988), 608 (1988), 636 (1989), 641 (1989) and 694 (1991) and learning of the deportation of twelve Palestinians by Israel in the occupied territories, the Council condemned the deportations that were in violation of the Fourth Geneva Convention referring to the protection of civilians in times of war.

The resolution deplored the action and reiterated that Israel should refrain from deporting any more Palestinians and ensure the safe and immediate return of those deported. Israel did not comply with the resolution, and continued to deport Palestinians who were suspected of being involved in terrorist activities to neighbouring Arab countries.

See also
 Arab–Israeli conflict
 First Intifada
 Israeli–Palestinian conflict
 List of United Nations Security Council Resolutions 701 to 800 (1991–1993)

References

External links
 
Text of the Resolution at undocs.org

 0726
 0726
Israeli–Palestinian conflict and the United Nations
1992 in Israel
January 1992 events